Sierra de Nava Alta or Sierra de la Nava Alta is a mountain range in the Valdejalón comarca, Aragon, Spain, located west of the A-121 road, between Fuendejalón and Ricla and east of Tierga and Mesones de Isuela.

Geography

The ridge's highest summits are Peña de las Armas (1154 m), Buitrera de Valdearcos (994 m) and Monegre (922 m).

The Santuario de la Virgen de Rodanas is located in the Sierra de Nava Alta, about 12 km to the west of Épila town. The road to the sanctuary from Épila is not paved.
 
These mountains are covered with low and mostly sparse maquis shrub, with some juniper, Carrasca (Quercus ilex) and pine trees. They suffered intense exploitation in the past, with overgrazing by cattle and excessive firewood gathering.

See also
Mountains of Aragon
Valdejalón

References

External links

 Santuario de Rodanas 
 Valdejalón

Nava Alta
Nava Alta